Charles Langlois may refer to:
Charles Langlois (actor) (1692–1762), French actor
Charles Langlois (politician) (born 1938), Canadian politician
Charlie Langlois (1894–1965), Canadian ice hockey player